Clyde is a census-designated place (CDP) in Contra Costa County, California, United States. The population was 678 at the 2010 census.

History 

In 1917, the United States Shipping Board provided a government loan to the Pacific Coast Shipbuilding Company to build a company town.  The board commissioned Bernard Maybeck to be supervising architect for laying out the new town.  He designed the hotel and around 200 of the initial homes built in the town.  George Applegarth was hired as acting architect. In this position, he drew many of the architectural plans for the town.

Geography 

Demographics 

The 2010 United States Census reported that Clyde had a population of 678. The racial makeup of Clyde was 530 (78.2%) White, 11 (1.6%) African American, four (0.6%) Native American, 58 (8.6%) Asian, three (0.4%) Pacific Islander, 25 (3.7%) from other races, and 47 (6.9%) from two or more races. Hispanic or Latino of any race were 99 persons (14.6%).

Education
It is in the Mount Diablo Unified School District.

References 

Census-designated places in Contra Costa County, California
Census-designated places in California